The following is the filmography of the Mexican actress Thalía.

Filmography

Film

Television

Theater

Music videos

References 

Filmography
Actress filmographies
Mexican filmographies